Government Model College Deithor is situated in Deithor near Deopahar Numaligarh  in Bokajan Legislative assembly of Karbi Anglong district of Assam in India. It is second Government College after 
Diphu Government College established under Rastriya Uchahtar Siksha Abhiyan ( RUSA) of Directorate of Higher Education, Government of Assam. It is affiliated to Dibrugarh University.

References

Colleges in India
 Education in Assam